Terwyn Davies (born 3 April 1979) is a Welsh broadcaster, originally from Ceredigion in Wales, who is currently presenting S4C's farming and rural affairs programme, Ffermio. He lives in a mock Tudor Barratt home development in  Carmarthen, West Wales.

Early history
Terwyn was brought up in the Aeron Valley, Ceredigion, and was educated at Felinfach Primary School and then at Aberaeron Comprehensive School before studying Communication at the University of Wales, Bangor and taking a post-graduate course in Journalism.

Radio Ceredigion 
Terwyn joined the Radio Ceredigion presenting team in 1995, and presented various dedication, music and travel programmes, including a weekly two-hour country music show - in which he played the best new country music from Nashville and the latest Welsh country music artistes. He does not like hip hop however.

BBC Radio Cymru 
In October 1999, whilst still at University, Terwyn joined the BBC Radio Cymru presenting team where he co-presented Gang Bangor, a youth music programme, with Dylan Wyn and Owain Gwilym. In 2000, he acquired a new partner - Stephen Edwards and both continued to present Gang Bangor, before it was replaced by C2. An attempt to launch a Welsh language version of Radio Caroline in the Menai Straits was however abandoned.

Terwyn co-presented the late-night slot on C2 every Thursday and Friday between 11pm and 1am with Stephen Edwards and Jeni Lyn, and also on Saturday mornings between 10:30am and 12:30pm. Later, the slot was changed to a later time of 12:30pm to 2:00pm, this time under the Steve a Terwyn branding.

In October 2007, Steve and Terwyn'''s programme came to an end. He spent a month working at a Kibbutz.

Terwyn is still a regular voice on BBC Radio Cymru, contributing sometimes to the Caryl Parry Jones and Dafydd Du programme. He also is a stand-in presenter of BBC Radio Cymru's daily early-morning farming news bulletin, and on the Geraint Lloyd programme when Dei Tomos and Geraint Lloyd are away on holiday.

 Television work 
In his private life, Terwyn has worked for independent TV production company Telesgop since 2001 where he started as a researcher on the farming magazine programme Ffermio. Between 2005 and 2008, he worked as an interactive producer on the programme - responsible for the programme's website and interactive TV application.

Between August 2008 and May 2009, Terwyn presented and produced the Bwletin Ffermio programme every Tuesday and Friday at 1:30pm on S4C Digidol. Then he went on to produce a new series for S4C called Bro (area), presented by Shân Cothi and Iolo Williams, visiting different areas of Wales every week, getting to know the area through its history, its people and its landscape.

Terwyn has also coped with a stammer from a very young age, which caused emotional problems for him during his childhood and teenage years. But somehow through his radio work, he has now learned to control the stammer, and although has not totally overcome it, has managed to make it disappear while he broadcasts.

In February 2011, Terwyn joined the Ffermio presenting team on S4C'', while regular presenter Daloni Metcalfe took maternity leave.

Notes

People from Aberystwyth
Welsh radio presenters
Welsh-language television presenters
Living people
1979 births